Allen Chapel African Methodist Episcopal Church is an African Methodist Episcopal (AME) church located at 902 Broadway in Lincoln, Illinois. The church was built in 1880 to house Lincoln's African Methodist Episcopal congregation, which formed in 1868. The building has a vernacular design with Gothic arched windows and entrances. As a black church, Allen Chapel served as a center of Lincoln's small African-American community. The church hosted the community's religious and social events, and as an AME church it provided AME publications to and helped educate its members. As Lincoln was both segregated and predominantly white for much of the church's early history, the church played an important role as one of the few organizations dedicated to improving the lives of the city's black residents. The church is still used for religious services.

The church was added to the National Register of Historic Places on May 12, 2004.

References

Churches on the National Register of Historic Places in Illinois
Churches completed in 1880
Buildings and structures in Logan County, Illinois
African Methodist Episcopal churches in Illinois
National Register of Historic Places in Logan County, Illinois